Nathan Henry Chamberlain (25 December 1830, Bourne, Massachusetts - 1 April 1901) was a United States clergyman, first a Unitarian, and later an Episcopalian.

Biography
He graduated from Harvard in 1853, and studied theology at the divinity school there, and at Heidelberg, Germany, eventually becoming a Unitarian minister. He was pastor at Canton, Massachusetts, 1857–59, and at Baltimore, Maryland, 1860-63. He then took orders in the Episcopal Church, and became rector at Birmingham, Connecticut, 1864–67; Morrisania, New York, 1868–71; Milwaukee, Wisconsin, 1871–73; Somerville, Massachusetts, 1874–79; East Boston, Massachusetts, 1882-89. He then retired to devote himself to literary pursuits.

Writings
Autobiography of a New England Parish (1864)
The Sphinx in Aubrey Parish (1889)
What is the Matter with our Tariff and its Taxes (1890)
Samuel Sewall and the World He Lived In, a study of colonial life in New England (1897)
Life of Sir Charles Napier
An Itinerary of Cape Cod

Notes

References

External links
 

1830 births
1901 deaths
19th-century American writers
American clergy
Heidelberg University alumni
Harvard Divinity School alumni
19th-century American clergy
American expatriates in Germany